Susan Fassbender (born Susan Kathryn Whincup, later Baggio, 30 April 1959 – 2 May 1991) was an English singer, songwriter and musician best remembered for the single "Twilight Café", which reached No. 21 in the UK Singles Chart in February 1981.

Career
Born in Wibsey, Bradford, West Yorkshire, England, Fassbender (which was her mother's maiden name) began studying classical piano, clarinet and timpani (later also playing synthesizer) at age 13. Eventually she met guitarist Kay Russell, who would become her songwriting partner throughout her career. Both women wrote lyrics and melodies together. Prior to their collaboration, Russell was with poet Nick Toczek in a Bradford-based new wave outfit called Ulterior Motives.

After impressing their future manager Alan Brown at a musical instrument shop, Fassbender and Russell signed to independent record label Criminal Records and wrote "Twilight Café", which was released in 1980. Two appearances on BBC Television's Top of the Pops followed in January 1981, with a band also consisting of drummer Gary Walsh and bassist Mike Close. By this point, ownership of the single had passed from Criminal to CBS Records. In March 1981, Fassbender appeared on German television programme, Disco.

Two other singles followed soon after, namely "Stay" and "Merry-Go-Round". "Stay", the second single, was promoted by an appearance on Cheggers Plays Pop, a children's programme. Both tracks were collaborations between Fassbender and Russell. In January 1982, Fassbender and Russell appeared on another British TV show, Multi-Coloured Swap Shop, to promote "Merry-Go-Round".

After release of the latter singles, Susan Fassbender and Kay Russell both retired temporarily from the music industry, to marry and for Fassbender to raise three daughters. She was married in 1983, when her name became Susan Baggio. Further songs were written, separately and together, by both women, but no further interest was shown by the industry in releasing the new material. 

A new album of unreleased Fassbender and Russell demos entitled Twilight Café (The Demo Collection 1981–1985) was released through Platform Records on iTunes and Amazon on 30 April 2012.

Susan Fassbender died by suicide in May 1991, at the age of 32.

Discography

Singles
"Twilight Café" / "(We'll) Get Around It" (1980) UK #21, IE #24
"Stay" / "Comment Ça Va" (24 April 1981) – released as "Fassbender–Russell"
"Merry-Go-Round" / "Reasons" (1981)

"Twilight Café" was released on Criminal Records and later CBS in both the UK and Germany, and on Lark Records in Belgium and the Netherlands, also later on CBS. The latter two singles reverted to Criminal and Lark. "Twilight Café" was also available as a 12" maxi single in Germany. All tracks were written by Fassbender and Russell.

Albums
Twilight Café (The Demo Collection 1981–1985) (April 2012, Platform Records)
Building A Dream (June 2016, Platform Records)
Live in Concert (1981) (June 2016, Platform Records)  

In 2012, Platform Records released Twilight Café (The Demo Collection 1981–1985), a 20 track album of previously unavailable recordings from Susan Fassbender and Kay Russell. The collection included the original demo version of the duo's hit single, as well as other songs familiar to Fassbender/Russell fans, including several of those featured on the second and final of their CBS 7" singles. The release contained 70 minutes of music, remastered from cassette tapes preserved by Kay Russell.

A follow-up collection entitled Building A Dream (The Demo Collection Volume 2) containing 17 further recordings, was released on 17 June 2016, along with a separate 10 track release entitled Live in Concert (1981).

References

Other source
 Record Mirror, p. 8, "Into the Twilight Zone", 24 January 1981

External links
Susan Fassbender at Discogs
Susan Fassbender at MusicBrainz
 Kay Russell official site

1959 births
English women singer-songwriters
People from Wibsey
Musicians from Bradford
English new wave musicians
Women new wave singers
20th-century English singers
English women pop singers
20th-century English women singers
1991 suicides
Suicides in England